In the context of computer programming, instrumentation refers to the measure of a product's performance, in order to diagnose errors and to write trace information. Instrumentation can be of two types: source instrumentation and binary instrumentation.

Output 
In programming, instrumentation means:

 Profiling: measuring dynamic program behaviors during a training run with a representative input.  This is useful for properties of a program that  cannot be analyzed statically with sufficient precision, such as alias analysis.
 Inserting timers into functions.
 Logging major events such as crashes.

Limitations 

Instrumentation is limited by execution coverage.  If the program never reaches a particular point of execution, then instrumentation at that point collects no data.  For instance, if a word processor application is instrumented, but the user never activates the print feature, then the instrumentation can say nothing about the routines which are used exclusively by the printing feature.

Some types of instrumentation may cause a dramatic increase in execution time.  This may limit the application of instrumentation to debugging contexts.

See also
 Hooking – range of techniques used to alter or augment the behavior of an operating system, of applications, or of other software components by intercepting function calls or messages or events passed between software components.
 Instruction set simulator – simulation of all instructions at machine code level to provide instrumentation
 Runtime intelligence – technologies, managed services and practices for the collection, integration, analysis, and presentation of application usage levels, patterns, and practices.
 Software performance analysis – techniques to monitor code performance, including instrumentation.
 Hardware performance counter
 DTrace – A comprehensive dynamic tracing framework for troubleshooting kernel and application problems on production systems in real time, implemented in Solaris, macOS, FreeBSD, and many other platforms and products.
 Java Management Extensions (JMX) –  Java technology for managing and monitoring applications, system objects, devices (such as printers), and service-oriented networks.
 Application Response Measurement – standardized instrumentation API for C and Java.
 Dynamic recompilation – a feature of some emulators and virtual machines where the system may recompile some part of a program during execution.

References

 Introduction to Instrumentation and Tracing: Microsoft Developer Network
 Apple Developer Tools: Introduction to Instruments
 SystemTap provides free software (GPL) infrastructure to simplify the gathering of information about the running Linux system.
 cwrap Auto wrap C and C++ functions with instrumentation.

Software optimization
System administration
Management systems
Debugging